The Huawei STREAM X GL07S is a mobile phone manufactured by Huawei, Inc..

It is the first LTE phone distributed by Japanese carrier EMOBILE.

Features 

The GL07S features a 4.7-inch capacitive touchscreen, a quad-core CPU and a 16-core GPU.

Physical buttons are the power button, a volume control on the side of the phone. There are three touch buttons for Back, Home, Menu.

It is a forerunner to the Huawei Ascend P2, which Huawei claims will be "the world’s fastest smartphone".

It ships with Android 4.1 and Huawei's Emotion UI.

Notes

External links
Product specifications on the Huawei website

Android (operating system) devices
Huawei smartphones
Mobile phones introduced in 2013